Cyclone Sam (JTWC designation: 03S) was an intense tropical cyclone that brought flooding rainfall to a wide swath of northern Australia in December 2000. The first tropical cyclone of the regional season, Sam originated from a tropical low that formed in the Arafura Sea on 28 November. Tracking generally westward, the initial low-pressure area remained generally weak until it entered the Timor Sea, by which time it had strengthened into a tropical cyclone on 5 December. Though a subtropical ridge was forcing the cyclone westward at the time, an approaching shortwave trough caused Sam to track southward the following day, towards the Australian coast. During its southward progression, Sam rapidly intensified, and reached its peak intensity on 8 December. Soon afterwards, the storm made landfall near Lagrange, Western Australia at the same intensity. Once inland, Sam was slow to weaken as it re-curved eastward, and persisted for nearly a week inland before dissipating on 14 December.

Throughout its existence, Cyclone Sam brought heavy rainfall to a wide swath of northern Australia. Upon making landfall, damage was considerable, albeit localized. Most of the destruction wrought by Sam occurred near the coast, particularly in Bidyadanga and Anna Springs Station. Some buildings sustained considerable damage, and trees and power lines were felled, resulting in some power outages. Offshore, 163 illegal immigrants aboard two vessels were feared to have drowned, which would make Sam one of the deadliest cyclones in Australian history. However, these people were later accounted for. After the season, the name Sam was retired from the regional naming list.

Meteorological history

During an active Madden–Julian oscillatory period over Australian longitudes in late November, a broad low-pressure area developed within the monsoon trough in the southeastern Arafura Sea, west of Cape York Peninsula. Due to its potential for development, the Bureau of Meteorology Tropical Cyclone Warning Center in Darwin (TCWC Darwin) began monitoring the system on 28 November. Tracking westward, the low eventually moved into the Timor Sea three days later and became quasi-stationary in forward motion. Situated within a good outflow environment, the Joint Typhoon Warning Center (JTWC) began monitoring the disturbance at 0300 UTC on 1 December, assessing it with a 'poor' likelihood of cyclogenesis; these probabilities as assessed by the JTWC would increase up until eventual formation. Nonetheless, TCWC Darwin began issuing tropical-related products on the disturbance beginning at 0730 UTC the following day. At 0000 UTC on 3 December, the JTWC analyzed that the tropical low had organized into a tropical depression. Positioned within favorable conditions under a subtropical ridge, the depression began to strengthen. At 0400 UTC on 5 December, TCWC Perth, having assumed local area responsibilities for the tracking of the storm, determined the system to have strengthened into a tropical cyclone. As such, the warning center assigned the name Sam to the storm. Although a tropical cyclone warning was issued twelve hours prior, the JTWC followed suit by classifying Sam as a tropical storm at 1200 UTC the same day.

Upon tropical cyclogenesis on 5 December, the surrounding atmospheric conditions were generally favorable for continued development; however, a northeasterly wind flow generated wind shear, somewhat inhibiting development and partially exposing Sam's low level center of circulation as it tracked westward. Over the following two days, however, the tropical cyclone's rainbands were able to fully enclose the center of circulation. During the evening hours of 6 December, however, Sam began to interact with a shortwave trough, causing the cyclone to curve southward and towards the northwestern coast of Australia. Over the following day, an eye started to form and Sam began to rapidly intensify. At 0400 UTC, the storm attained Category 3 cyclone intensity on the Bureau of Meteorology cyclone scale. Ten hours later, Category 4 intensity was achieved. Around the same time, Sam briefly became stationary before resuming its southward trek. The JTWC rated the storm as a Category 3 hurricane on the Saffir–Simpson hurricane wind scale. At the same intensity, Sam made landfall near Lagrange, Western Australia at 1300 UTC on 8 December. Upon moving ashore, Sam began to slowly weaken over the Great Sandy Desert. On 9 December, the JTWC ceased the monitoring of the system, as the weakened Sam began to curve eastward. After a brief period of restrengthening over central Australia on 13 December, Sam finally weakened below tropical cyclone intensity the following day before dissipating shortly thereafter.

Preparations and impact

As a precursor low-pressure area, Sam brought widespread rainfall throughout a wide swath of northern Australia. Due to its proximity to the coast throughout its existence, associated rainfall continued to affect the region throughout Sam's existence. As Sam approached the coast, numerous warnings were issued, with storm warnings posted for Cape Leveque to Pardoo Station on 8 December. Meteorologists indicated that the storm would be a threat to shipping in the immediate regions. Due to the storm's impending threat to the northwestern coast of Australia, most of the residents of Bidyadanga and Anna Springs Station were evacuated via helicopter. Upon landfall, though severe damage was wrought, damage was localized. Some buildings were severely damaged, and trees, power lines, sheds, and fences were downed by the strong winds. Staff quarters and sheds in the Anna Plains Station were demolished. The cattle station also lost electrical power during the storm.

As a result, the two ships, in total carrying 167 illegal immigrants, sank. A nearby Japanese tanker was only able to rescue four survivors, and as such, the 163 others were assumed dead. However, the stricken passengers were later found in Indonesia. Heavy rainfall caused by Sam resulted in flooding further inland. A weather station in Shelamar near the point of landfall recorded  of precipitation in a 48-hour period ending during the morning hours of 11 December. However, this was likely only a 24-hour measurement due to a lack of human observation as a result of area evacuations.

Retirement
Due to the destruction wrought by Sam, the name was retired after the season. This made it the 34th tropical cyclone within the area of responsibility of TCWC Perth to have its name retired.

See also

Cyclone Chris – One of the strongest tropical cyclones to impact Western Australia
Cyclone Anette – Strong tropical cyclone that caused heavy cattle losses in Western Australia
Cyclone Fay – Late-season tropical cyclone that brought record rainfall to Western Australia
Other storms with the same name

Notes

References

External links

2000–01 Australian region cyclone season
Tropical cyclones in Western Australia
2000 in Australia
Retired Australian region cyclones
Category 5 Australian region cyclones
2000s in Western Australia